Clayton Frechette (April 7, 1892 – December 23, 1974) was a Canadian professional ice hockey player. He played with the Montreal Canadiens of the National Hockey Association from in the 1912–13 season and 1913–14 season, appearing in a total of two games.

References

External links
Clayton Frechette at JustSportsStats

1892 births
1974 deaths
Montreal Canadiens (NHA) players
Sportspeople from Belleville, Ontario
Canadian ice hockey defencemen